This is a list of electoral results for the electoral district of Wagin in Western Australian state elections.

Members for Wagin

Election results

Elections in the 2010s

Elections in the 2000s

Elections in the 1990s

Elections in the 1980s

Elections in the 1940s

Elections in the 1930s

Elections in the 1920s

Elections in the 1910s

References

Western Australian state electoral results by district